Fiji sent a delegation to compete in the 1988 Winter Olympics in Calgary, Alberta, Canada from 13–28 February 1988.  This was their debut appearance at a Winter Olympic Games. The sole athlete sent by Fiji to Calgary was Rusiate Rogoyawa, in cross-country skiing.  In the 15 kilometre classical race, he finished in 83rd place.

Background
The Fiji Association of Sports and National Olympic Committee was recognised by the International Olympic Committee on 31 December 1954.  They made their first Olympic appearance at the 1956 Summer Olympics, and with two exceptions, have participated at every Summer Olympic Games since; they missed the 1964 edition, and boycotted the 1980 Games.  They were making their debut Winter Olympics appearance in Calgary.  The only athlete sent by Fiji to Calgary was Rusiate Rogoyawa, a cross-country skier.  He was the flag bearer for the opening ceremony.

Competitors
The following is the list of number of competitors in the Games.

Cross-country skiing

Rusiate Rogoyawa was 26 years old at the time of the Calgary Olympics.  A Fijian native, he learned to ski while studying engineering in Norway.  On 19 February, he skied in the 15 kilometre classical event, and finished with a time of 1 hour, 1 minute and 26.3 seconds.  This put him in 83rd place out of 85 athletes who finished the race, and 20 minutes behind the gold medal time set by Mikhail Devyatyarov of the Soviet Union.

See also
 Fiji at the 1988 Summer Olympics

References

Nations at the 1988 Winter Olympics
1988
1988 in Fijian sport